Hotel Paradise (Swedish: Pensionat Paradiset) is a 1937 Swedish comedy film directed by Weyler Hildebrand and starring Thor Modéen,  Maritta Marke and Nils Ericson. It was shot at the Råsunda Studios in Stockholm. The film's sets were designed by the art director Arne Åkermark.

Synopsis
The guests of a boarding house, the Hotel Paradise, anxiously await the arrival of an opera singer. When a tailor turns up he is mistaken for the singer and has to imitate the role.

Cast 
Thor Modéen as Julle Bergström
Maritta Marke as Lotta Bergström
Nils Ericson as Nisse
Julia Cæsar as Elvira Pettersson
Greta Ericsson as Margit
Carl Hagman as Don Carlos
Lili Ziedner as Ms. Cronblom
Carl-Gunnar Wingård as Pålsson
 Folke Helleberg as 	Eric Karlsson
 Arthur Fischer as Kihlman AKA Baron de Planche
 John Botvid as 	Fernlund
 Hugo Jacobsson as 	Svärd
 Hugo Bolander as 	Recording Clerk
 Helga Brofeldt as 	Pensions Guest
 Sigge Fürst as 	Singing man on steam boat
 Sven-Eric Gamble as 	Pelle Pålsson
 Hjördis Gille as 	Ms. Ström
 Linnéa Hillberg as 	Countess Klingenhjelm
 Arne Lindblad as 	Pensions Guest
 Richard Lund as 	Jonsson
 Siri Olson as 	Pensions Guest
 Åke Uppström as 	Mr. Roos
 Bullan Weijden as Mrs. Pålsson

Soundtrack 
Thor Modéen – "En Äkta Mexikanare" (Music and Lyrics by Jules Sylvain and Sven Paddock)

References

Bibliopgraphy
 Sundholm, John . Historical Dictionary of Scandinavian Cinema. Scarecrow Press, 2012.
 Wallengren, Ann-Kristin.  Welcome Home Mr Swanson: Swedish Emigrants and Swedishness on Film. Nordic Academic Press, 2014.

External links 

1937 films
1937 comedy films
Swedish comedy films
1930s Swedish-language films
Swedish black-and-white films
Films directed by Weyler Hildebrand
1930s Swedish films